The Milwaukee Road Class "A" was a class of high-speed, streamlined 4-4-2 "Atlantic" type steam locomotives built by the American Locomotive Company (ALCO) from 1935 to 1937 to haul the Milwaukee Road's Hiawatha express passenger trains. Numbered from No. 1 to No. 4, they were among the last Atlantic type locomotives built in the United States, and certainly the largest and most powerful. Although partially supplanted by the larger class "F7" Hudsons from 1937, they remained in top-flight service until the end. Locomotive No. 3 was taken out of service in 1949 and cannibalized for spare parts to keep the other three running until 1951.

History

Designed for a 6½ hour schedule between Chicago and St. Paul, the class proved capable of handling nine cars on a 6¼ hour schedule. The only change over the years, except bumps and dents in the casing, was the addition of a Mars Light beneath the winged emblem on the nose in 1947.

They hauled the fastest scheduled steam-powered trains in the world. A run with a dynamometer car behind the locomotive was made on May 15, 1935, by locomotive No. 2 between Milwaukee and New Lisbon, Wisconsin. This was the fastest authenticated speed reached by a steam locomotive at the time, making No. 2 the rail speed record holder for steam and the first steam locomotive to top . There are reports, without evidence or accurate records, that these locomotives could exceed . Such speeds would have placed the class A in contention with the LNER Class A4 and German BR 05 for the crown of fastest steam locomotive until that time, but no records have been unearthed.

The design was fairly conventional but unusual in some aspects. One goal was reducing reciprocating mass, which could not be completely balanced. Reciprocating mass of the connecting rods was also reduced with the use of four, rather than the more usual six, driving wheels. The main rods connected to the first pair of driven wheels rather than the (more conventional) second; again, this reduced the reciprocating mass as well as providing more even power throughout the stroke. The large  diameter driving wheels reduced piston speed and made high speed less taxing on the machinery. The streamlined casings were designed to open easily for servicing; the front end had clamshell doors ahead of the smokebox.

References

External links

Streamlined steam locomotives
A
ALCO locomotives
4-4-2 locomotives
Passenger locomotives
Railway locomotives introduced in 1935
Steam locomotives of the United States
Scrapped locomotives